Adoneta gemina is a species of moth in the family Limacodidae (slug caterpillar moths), in the superfamily Zygaenoidea (flannel, slug caterpillar, leaf skeletonizer moths and kin). It was described by Harrison Gray Dyar Jr. in 1906 from southern Texas.

The MONA or Hodges number for Adoneta gemina is 4682.

References

Further reading
Arnett, Ross H. (2000). American Insects: A Handbook of the Insects of America North of Mexico. CRC Press.

External links
Butterflies and Moths of North America

Limacodidae
Moths described in 1906